Lee Jung-hyun (born February 7, 1980), also known by her occasional stage name Ava, is a South Korean pop singer and actress. She was first recognized for her acting abilities with award-winning role in her first film and has been solidified as one of the top international acts from South Korea with her illustrious singing career. She has been known as "the Techno Queen" as she introduced the techno music genre to Korea. Lee is also known as "The Queen of Transformation" due to her changing new look for different songs. She is known as one of the first artists who introduced Korean Wave (Hallyu) to China and caused a sensation.

Career

As actress
Lee Jung-hyun made her acting debut at the age of 16 in A Petal in 1996, which won her 'Best New Actress' at the 34th Grand Bell Awards, 17th Blue Dragon Film Awards and 16th Korean Association of Film Critics Awards. The film tells the story of a girl who experienced the Gwangju uprising at the age of 15, and its effect on her life in later years. Since 1996, Lee has had numerous acting roles with projects in South Korea, Japan and China.

In 2010, Lee regained her acting strides with the Chinese series Confucius, playing the role of Nanzi. In 2011, Lee portrayed a shaman in Park Chan-wook and Park Chan-kyong's award-winning fantasy short film Night Fishing, which was shot entirely on an iPhone. Night Fishing won the Golden Bear for Best Short Film at 2011 Berlin International Film Festival. In 2012, Lee portrayed a single mother in the coming-of-age film Juvenile Offender, which won Best Feature at the Tokyo International Film Festival. She was next cast in the 2014 period blockbuster The Admiral: Roaring Currents, as the sole female character in the main cast. Lee returned to television in the SBS' drama The Family is Coming.

In 2015, Lee starred in black comedy film Alice in Earnestland, which won her 'Best Actress' at the 36th Blue Dragon Film Awards & 3rd Wildflower Film Awards. Lee then starred in the bowling film Split in 2016, and war film The Battleship Island in 2017. In 2019, Lee is scheduled to star in the romantic comedy film Shall We Do It Again.

In 2020, Lee starred in the zombie film Peninsula. The following year, she appeared in Park Chan-wook's mystery film Decision to Leave.

As singer
After debuting with an award-winning acting performance, Lee etched her singing career by introducing techno genre to the K-Pop scene and her ever-reinventing styles for each and every song. Lee assumes a unique persona for each release, such as a mermaid, Barbie doll, tribal queen, soldier, Korean folk dancer, belly dancer, or princess of the sea. She has garnered many nicknames over the years, including Techno Queen of Korea, Queen of Performance Art, Ms. Charisma, Little Giant, and Queen of Change.

Before releasing her first solo music she featured as a guest vocalist on the Jo PD single "Fever", also appearing in the music video. She also appeared in the music video for Goofy's "The Rule of the Game".

Her early work is techno-style dance music. Her first single, Wa (와, "Come") topped the Korean charts for three weeks, while her second, Bakkweo (바꿔, "Change") won awards for Best Song and Most Broadcast Song. These two songs were covered by artists throughout Asia and Europe. Many of her earlier songs are sung in an angry mood, from the perspective of a rejected lover. These two singles firmly established Lee as one of the top Korean singers who successfully gained popularity throughout Asia with her strong colorful performances.

Ahead of the 2002 general elections, the singer was asked by political parties if they could use "Change" in their campaigns, to which she declined. 

Lee released Japanese versions of her early hits Wa and Heaven in December 2004. The single ranked #26 on Oricon chart in Week 3 of January 2005. Heaven was a theme song for the Korean drama Beautiful Days. The drama became widely popular in Japan. On December 31, 2004, Lee was invited to perform Heaven and Wa-come on- and participate at the 55th edition of Kōhaku Uta Gassen, an annual New Year's Eve live music show. In 2006, she released her first Japanese album, This is Hyony.

Lee was the first foreigner to participate in singing the Beijing Olympic 2008 Theme Song.
In 2008, she released her first Mandarin album with title single "Love Me".

With her fifth album, Passion, she switched to a Latin-influenced sound, complete with Spanish Guitar and flamenco-style tap dance.

In May 2009, she released her first Korean mini album Avaholic, featuring a trio of songs, "Crazy," "Vogue It Girl" and "Miro". The music video "Crazy" was choreographed by Brian Friedman. In September 2009, she was invited to open at Lady Gaga's The Fame Ball Tour in Club Answer, Seoul, South Korea. In December 2009, Lee sung her first ballad for the soundtrack of the Korean TV drama Iris. The song, "How Can I Hold Back Tears," takes her to the ballad genre for the first time in her over 10-year singing career.

In 2010, her seventh album was released on May 11, 2010 with the title song, "Suspicious Man." In this title single's music video, Lee once again showed her dynamic performance range by introducing a vengeful assassin with a short blonde do. The seventh album was entitled, "007th."

In 2013, she released her single entitled "V", featuring Jin Goo in a music video directed by Park Chan-wook and Park Chan-kyong, with whom she'd previously worked on Night Fishing.

Cultural ambassador
In August 2007, singer-actress Lee was named a UNESCO Goodwill Ambassador.

On June 22, 2012, Lee was appointed as an honorary ambassador for the Korea-China Cultural Industry Conference, called CICON.

Personal life
Lee married an orthopedic doctor in a private ceremony in 2019. During her appearance on Stars' Top Recipe at Fun-Staurant, her husband, whose face was censored due to privacy concerns, was dubbed as "Baby".

On December 7, 2021, Lee announced that she is pregnant on her YouTube channel.

On April 23, 2022, Lee's agency confirmed that Lee gave birth to her first daughter on April 20, 2022.

In music arcade games
Lee's music has been featured in rhythm games. "Wa" and "Bakkwo" were included in the Korean dance game "Let's Dance". These songs were also featured in the Korean releases of Dance Dance Revolution 3rdMix, as well as the Dance Dance Revolution 4thMix games. Also, "Nuh" (Trance Mix) was featured in EZ2Dancer.

Her song "Come On!" is featured in the Pump It Up NX Absolute dance machine, both a short Chinese version and the full song version appearing in it.

Currently, "I'll Give", "Going Crazy" and other songs are featured on Audition, an online dance-rhythm game.

Discography

Korean
 Let's Go to My Star (1999)
 Lee Jung Hyun II (2000)
 Magic to Go to My Star (2001)
 I ♡ Natural  (2002)
 Passion (2004)
 Fantastic Girl (2006)
 Lee Jung Hyun 007th (2010)

Japanese
 This is Hyony (2006)

Chinese 
 Love Me (2008)

Filmography

Film

Television series

Television show

Video games
 2001: Tomak: Save the Earth, a Love Story

Awards and nominations

Acting Awards

Music awards

References

External links
  
 
 

1980 births
Chung-Ang University alumni
K-pop singers
Living people
South Korean women pop singers
South Korean mandopop singers
South Korean female idols
MAMA Award winners
South Korean television actresses
South Korean film actresses
People from Gimje
20th-century South Korean women singers
21st-century South Korean women singers